The Society for Utopian Studies (founded 1975) is a North American interdisciplinary association devoted to the study of utopianism in all its forms, with a particular emphasis on literary and experimental utopias.

Publications

The Society publishes Utopian Studies, an international triannual peer-reviewed journal, containing scholarly articles on a wide range of subjects related to utopias, utopianism, utopian literature, utopian theory, and intentional communities. The journal's founding editor was Lyman Tower Sargent.

It also publishes a regular newsletter, Utopus Discovered.

Conferences

The Society has organized a series of annual conferences:

2022: Charleston, South Carolina.
2021: The 2021 conference was scheduled to be held at Austin, Texas, but was cancelled as a result of the COVID-19 pandemic.
2020: The 2020 conference was scheduled to be held at Charleston, South Carolina, but was cancelled as a result of the COVID-19 pandemic.
2019: Michigan State University, East Lansing.
2018: Berkeley, California.
2017: Memphis, Tennessee.
2016: St Petersburg, FL.
2015: Pittsburgh, PA.
2014: Montréal, Québec.
2013: College of Charleston, South Carolina.
2012: Toronto, Ontario.
2011: Stage College, PA.
2010: Milwaukee, Wisconsin.
2009: Wrightsville Beach, North Carolina.
2008: Portland, Maine.
2007: Toronto, Ontario.
2006: Colorado Springs, Colorado.
2005: Memphis, Tennessee.
2004: Toronto, Ontario.
2003: San Diego, California.
2002: Orlando, Florida.
2001: Buffalo, NY.
2000: Vancouver, B.C.
1999: San Antonio, Texas.
1997: Memphis, Tennessee.
1996: Nashville, Tennessee.
1995: Toronto, Ontario.
1994: Toronto, Ontario.
1993: University of Missouri-St Louis.
1992: Baltimore, Maryland
1991: Las Vegas, Nevada.
1990: Lexington, KY.
1989: Asilomar Conference Ctr., Pacific Grove, California.
1988: Emerson College, Boston, Mass.
1987: Pennsylvania State University, Delaware County.
1986: Asilomar Conference Ctr., Pacific Grove, California.
1985: Rensselaer Polytechnic Institute, Troy, NY.
1984: University of Missouri-St Louis.
1983: Indiana University of Pennsylvania.
1982: University of New Brunswick.
1981: Virginia Polytechnic Institute, Blacksburg.
1980: Pennsylvania State University.
1979: University of Colorado-Denver.
1978: Pennsylvania State University.
1977: University of Michigan.
1976: Rensselaer Polytechnic Institute, Troy, NY.

The 2023 conference is scheduled to be held at Austin, Texas.

Awards

The Society sponsors a number of awards:

The Arthur O. Lewis Award for the best paper by a younger scholar.
The Eugenio Battisti Award for the best article in the previous year's Utopian Studies. 
The Kenneth M. Roemer Innovative Course Design Award for innovative course design in utopian studies. 
The Larry E. Hough Distinguished Service Award.
The Lyman Tower Sargent Award for Distinguished Scholarship.

The Lyman Tower Sargent Award for Distinguished Scholarship

Recipients:

2017: Phillip E. Wegner
2013: Vita Fortunati and Darko Suvin
2012: Ruth Levitas
2010: Ursula K. Le Guin and Peter Fitting
2009: Fredric Jameson
2008: Tom Moylan and Ken Roemer
2002: Gregory Claeys
1997: Lyman Tower Sargent

References

External links
Society for Utopian Studies
Utopian Studies journal

Organizations established in 1975
Learned societies of the United States
Literary societies
Utopian studies